The 2011 national road cycling championships began in January in Australia and New Zealand. Most of the European national championships take place in June.

Jerseys
The winner of each national championship wears the national jersey in all their races for the next year in the respective discipline, apart from the World Championships, or unless they are wearing a category leader's jersey in a stage race. Most national champion jerseys tend to represent a country's flag or use the colours from it. Jerseys may also feature traditional sporting colours of a country that not derived from a national flag, such as the National colours of Australia on the jerseys of Australian national champions.

2011 champions

Men's Elite

Women's

Men's Under-23

References

External links
 UCI List of National Champions

National Cycling Championships, 2011
National road cycling championships by year